OFC Bdin is a Bulgarian football club based in Vidin, currently playing in the North-West Third League, the third level of Bulgarian football. Its home stadium "Georgi Benkovski" has a capacity of 15 000 seats. Club colors are red and white. The club was officially founded in 1923.

History 
The club was founded as Viktoria 23 in 1923. In 1946 they reached the Bulgarian Republic Football Championship semi-finals, eliminating Botev Plovdiv and Hadzhi Slavchev Pavlikeni along the way. They played in the A PFG in 1948-49 season, the first season of the league. They were relegated however.

Honours
 Semifinalist in the national championship tournament: 1946 
 Ninth place in the "A" group: 1948/49
 Four times 1/4 in the tournament National Cup: twice for the King's Cup – 1940 and 1941 and twice for the Cup of the Soviet Army – 1946 and 1948 / '49
 1/4 finalist in the tournament Cup of the Soviet Army (as a secondary event): 1982/83

Current squad 
As of 1 September 2015

History 
 2nd in 2008–09 Bulgarian V AFG North-West Group (Promoted)
 3rd in Bulgarian Republic Football Championship in 1946
 9th in "A" group in 1949
 1/4 final for Bulgarian Cup in 1940, 1941, 1946 and 1949
 1/4 final for Bulgarian Republic Football Championship in 1947 and 1948
 1/4 final for BFS cup in 1983

League positions

External links 
 FC Bdin official site

Bdin
Bdin
Association football clubs established in 1923
1923 establishments in Bulgaria